Gaodian (Mandarin: 高店镇) is a town in Ledu District, Haidong, Qinghai, China. In 2010, Gaodian had a total population of 8,388: 4,232 males and 4,156 females: 1,402 aged under 14, 6,299 aged between 15 and 65 and 687 aged over 65.

References 

Haidong
Populated places in Qinghai
Township-level divisions of Qinghai